Events in the year 2022 in Yemen

Incumbents

Events 
Ongoing — COVID-19 pandemic in Yemen — The Houthi–Saudi Arabian conflict (since 2015) — The Yemeni Civil War (2014–present)

 21 January – Saudi airstrike on a prison in Saada kills at least 87 people and injures more than 200 others.
 7 April – President Abdrabbuh Mansur Hadi was stepped down and transferred powers to Presidential Leadership Council

 6 September – At least 26 people were killed on Tuesday when Al-Qaeda militants attacked a military outpost managed by Yemeni security forces in the southern province of Abyan.

Deaths

References 

 

 
Yemen
Yemen
2020s in Yemen
Years of the 21st century in Yemen